Centennial High School (commonly referred to as CHS or CeHS) is a California Distinguished, public high school in the city of Corona, California.  It is one of eight high schools in the Corona-Norco Unified School District and is the only high school in the district that provides the International Baccalaureate program of study.

Campus 
The school was constructed in 1989 and is Internet-connected throughout.

It has the following facilities:
 6 tennis courts
 2 baseball fields, 2 softball fields, 2 soccer fields
 4 outdoor volleyball courts
 5 outdoor basketball courts
 A dance room
 A wrestling room
 A weight-lifting room
 A gymnasium and performing arts center which includes a Drama, choir and band room.
 A library/media center
 A football field
 Track and field facilities
 An outdoor pool
 A TV Studio

Athletics 
Centennial High was a member of the Mountain View League, however in the 2007-2008 school year the Mountain View League combined with another league and is now the Big VIII League.

Fall Sports:
 Cross Country JV/V (Boys)
 Cross Country JV/V (Girls)
 Football FR/JV/V (Boys)
 Golf (Girls)
 Tennis JV/V (Girls)
 Volleyball FR/JV/V (Girls)
 Water polo JV/V (Boys)
Winter Sports:
 Basketball FR/JV/V (Boys)
 Basketball FR/JV/V (Girls)
 Soccer FR/JV/V (Boys)
 Soccer FR/JV/V (Girls)
 Water Polo JV/V (Girls)
 Wrestling FR/JV/V (Boys)
 Wrestling (Girls) JV/V

Spring Sports:
 Baseball FR/JV/V (Boys)
 Golf JV/V (Boys)
 Softball FR/JV/V (Girls)
 Swimming JV/V (Boys)
 Swimming JV/V (Girls)
 Tennis JV/V (Boys)
 Track & Field JV/V (Boys)
 Track & Field JV/V (Girls)
 Volleyball JV/V (Boys)
 Lacrosse JV/V (Girls)
 Lacrosse JV/V (Boys)

Football 
The 2008 Centennial football team was undefeated and won its first State Championship.

Notable alumni

 Khalil Ahmad (2015)  – basketball player in the Israeli Basketball Premier League
Ike Anigbogu (2016) — Center for the Indiana Pacers
Vontaze Burfict (2009) — Middle linebacker for the Oakland Raiders
Camryn Bynum (2016) — Cornerback for the Minnesota Vikings
Brandon Magee (2008) — Outside Linebacker for the Cleveland Browns
Lonie Paxton (1996)— Long snapper for the Denver Broncos
Drake Jackson (2019) — Defensive End for the San Francisco 49ers
Segun Olubi (2017) — Linebacker for the San Francisco 49ers
Taylor Martinez (2009) — Quarterback for the Philadelphia Eagles
Javon McKinley (2016) — NFL player for the Detroit Lions
Matt Scott (2008)— Quarterback for the Edmonton Elks
Will Sutton (2009)  — Defensive Tackle for the Chicago Bears
J. J. Taylor (2016)  — Running Back for the New England Patriots
Tanner McKee (2018)  — Quarterback for the Stanford Cardinal

References

External links 
Centennial High School Webpage
Centennial High Sports at MaxPreps

High schools in Riverside County, California
International Baccalaureate schools in California
Educational institutions established in 1989
Education in Corona, California
Public high schools in California
Buildings and structures in Corona, California
1989 establishments in California